This is a list of broadcast television stations serving cities in the state of Alabama.

See also
List of television stations in Alabama
List of television stations in Alabama (by channel number)